An apple pie is a fruit pie in which the principal filling ingredient is apples. Apple pie is often served with whipped cream, ice cream ("apple pie à la mode"), custard or cheddar cheese. It is generally double-crusted, with pastry both above and below the filling; the upper crust may be solid or latticed (woven of crosswise strips). The bottom crust may be baked separately ("blind") to prevent it from getting soggy. Deep-dish apple pie often has a top crust only. Tarte Tatin is baked with the crust on top, but served with it on the bottom.

Apple pie is an unofficial symbol of the United States and one of its signature comfort foods.

Ingredients

Apple pie can be made with many different sorts of apples. The more popular cooking apples include Braeburn, Gala, Cortland, Bramley, Empire, Northern Spy, Granny Smith, and McIntosh. The fruit for the pie can be fresh, canned, or reconstituted from dried apples. Dried or preserved apples were originally substituted only at times when fresh fruit was unavailable. The basic ingredients of the filling are sugar, butter, a thickener like cornstarch and an acidic ingredient like lemon juice. Spices may be added according to taste, most commonly cinnamon, and sometimes nutmeg. Lemon juice is used to prevent oxidation of the apples when macerating the filling. Many older recipes call for honey in place of the then-expensive sugar.

Serving

Apple pie is often served à la mode, that is, topped with ice cream.

In another serving style, a piece of sharp cheddar cheese is placed on top of or alongside a slice of the finished pie. Apple pie with cheddar is popular in the American Midwest and New England, particularly in Vermont, where it is considered the state dish. In the north of England, Wensleydale cheese is often used.

Nutrition

A commercially prepared apple pie is 52% water, 34% carbohydrates, 2% protein, and 11% fat (table). A 100-gram serving supplies 237 Calories and 13% of the US recommended Daily Value of sodium, with no other micronutrients in significant content (table).

English style

Saffron colours the filling.

Modern English versions incorporate thick layers of sweetened slices of, usually, Bramley apple; layered into a dome shape to allow for downward shrinkage, and thus avoid a saggy middle; then topped with butter or lard shortcrust pastry; and baked until the apple filling is cooked.

In English-speaking countries, apple pie, often considered a comfort food, is a popular dessert, eaten hot or cold, on its own or with ice cream, double cream, or custard. Apple pies are often sold as mini versions in multipacks.

Dutch style

Recipes for Dutch apple pie go back to the Middle Ages. It was then baked in a typical Dutch oven. Once baked, the top crust (except at the edges) would be cut out from the middle, after which the apple slices were potentially put through a sieve before the pie was stirred with a wooden spoon. At this point the book recommends adding several spices to the pie, namely: cardamom, ginger, cinnamon, nutmeg, clove, mace and powdered sugar. Finally, after mixing the ingredients into the pie with cream, it is once again put into the oven to dry.

Traditional Dutch apple pie comes in two varieties, a crumb and a lattice style pie. Both recipes are distinct in that they typically call for flavourings of cinnamon and lemon juice to be added and differ in texture, not taste. Dutch apple pies may include ingredients such as full-cream butter, raisins and almond paste, in addition to ingredients such as apples and sugar, which they have in common with other recipes.

The basis of Dutch apple pie is a crust on the bottom and around the edges. This crust is then filled with pieces or slices of apple, usually a crisp and mildly tart variety such as Goudreinet or Elstar. Cinnamon and sugar are generally mixed in with the apple filling. Atop the filling, strands of dough cover the pie in a lattice holding the filling in place but keeping it visible or cover the pie with crumbs. It can be eaten warm or cold, sometimes with a dash of whipped cream or vanilla ice cream. In the US, "Dutch apple pie" refers specifically to the apple pie style with a crumb, streusel, topping.

French style 

One kind of French style apple pie is very different compared to the typical version of the sweet dessert. Instead of it being right side up with crust on top and bottom, it actually is upside down, with the fruit being caramelised. This can be made not only with apples but other fruits or vegetables as well, for example, pears or tomatoes.
See Tarte Tatin.

Others use a more traditional presentation, including variants like the Norman tart.

Swedish style

The Swedish style apple pie is predominantly a variety of apple crumble, rather than a traditional pastry pie. Often, breadcrumbs are used (wholly or partially) instead of flour, and sometimes rolled oats. It is usually flavoured with cinnamon and served with vanilla custard or ice cream. There is also a very popular version called  (apple cake), which differs from the pie in that it is a sponge cake baked with fresh apple pieces in it.

In American culture

Apple pie was brought to the colonies by the English, the Dutch, and the Swedes during the 17th and 18th centuries. Two recipes for apple pie appear in America's first cookbook, American Cookery by Amelia Simmons, which was published in 1796. 

The apple pie had to wait for the planting of European varieties, brought across the Atlantic, to become fruit-bearing apple trees, to be selected for their cooking qualities as there were no native apples except crabapples, which yield very small and sour fruit. In the meantime, the colonists were more likely to make their pies, or "pasties", from meat, calling them coffins (meaning basket) rather than fruit; and the main use for apples, once they were available, was in cider. However, there are American apple pie recipes, both manuscript and printed, from the 18th century, and it has since become a very popular dessert. Apple varieties are usually propagated by grafting, as clones, but in the New World, planting from seeds was more popular, which quickly led to the development of hundreds of new native varieties.

Apple pie was a common food in 18th-century Delaware. As noted by the New Sweden historian Dr. Israel Acrelius in a letter: "Apple pie is used throughout the whole year, and when fresh Apples are no longer to be had, dried ones are used. It is the evening meal of children."

The mock apple pie, made from crackers, was probably invented for use aboard ships, as it was known to the British Royal Navy as early as 1812. The earliest known published recipes for mock apple pie date from the antebellum period of the 1850s. In the 1930s, and for many years afterwards, Ritz Crackers promoted a recipe for mock apple pie using its product, along with sugar and various spices.

Apple pie was one of the dishes that Rhode Island army officers ate for their Fourth of July celebrations during the Siege of Petersburg.

Although eaten in Europe since long before the European colonization of the Americas, apple pie as used in the phrase "as American as apple pie" describes something as being "typically American". In the nineteenth and twentieth centuries, apple pie became a symbol of American prosperity and national pride. A newspaper article published in 1902 declared that "No pie-eating people can be permanently vanquished." The dish was also commemorated in the phrase "for Mom and apple pie"—supposedly the stock answer of American soldiers in World War II, whenever journalists asked why they were going to war. Jack Holden and Frances Kay sang in their patriotic 1950 song "The Fiery Bear", creating contrast between this symbol of U.S. culture and the Russian bear of the Soviet Union:

We love our baseball and apple pie
We love our county fair
We'll keep Old Glory waving high
There's no place here for a bear

Advertisers exploited the patriotic connection in the 1970s with the commercial jingle "baseball, hot dogs, apple pie and Chevrolet".

Modern American recipes for apple pie usually indicate a pastry that is 9 inches in diameter in a fluted pie plate, with an apple filling spiced with cinnamon, nutmeg, and lemon juice, and it may or may not have a lattice or shapes cut out of the top for decoration. One out of five Americans surveyed (19%) prefer apple pie over all others, followed by pumpkin (13%)
and pecan (12%).

The unincorporated community of Pie Town, New Mexico is named after apple pie.

See also

Apple strudel (German ), a large Austrian pastry made with apples, sugar and spices; similar to pie in that the filling is encased by the pastry, but it is rectangular rather than round and cut like coffee cake or stollen rather than like pie
 Apple turnover, similar to strudel but much smaller and triangular in shape, with a higher proportion of pastry to filling
 Apple cake
 Apple cobbler
 Applesauce cake
 List of apple dishes
 List of pies, tarts and flans

References

External links

Food Timeline history Notes: Apple Pie
A Apple Pie, by Kate Greenaway, 1886. Woodblock printed children's book, based on a much earlier rhyme; from Project Gutenberg
The Dutch Table: Dutch Apple Pie
Dutch Apple Pie Recipe by Liesbeth de Vos

American pies
American culture
British desserts
British pies
Dutch pastries
English cuisine
European cuisine
German cuisine
Fruit pies
Swedish pastries
Thanksgiving food
National dishes
Christmas food
Independence Day (United States) foods
Pie